The Uzbek Wikipedia is the Uzbek-language edition of the free online encyclopedia Wikipedia. It was founded in December 2003. Articles in the Uzbek-language edition are written in the Latin script. In August 2012, a Latin-to-Cyrillic converter was added to allow users to view Uzbek Wikipedia's pages in both the Latin and Cyrillic scripts.

Although Uzbek is spoken by an estimated 37 million people and Uzbekistan has nearly 17 million Internet users, there are not many active editors in the Uzbek Wikipedia and a majority of the existing articles are poorly sourced. Since early 2012, however, both the number of active users and well-written articles have increased noticeably. The number of visits to the encyclopedia has also been rising lately. Especially in May 2022, activity has boomed to more than 500 active users and activity has more than doubled from 2019 to 2022, from 1,100 to nearly 1,920 users in 2021. In early 2013, the Uzbek-language Wikipedia ranked first among different editions of Wikipedia in terms of annual page-view growth.

The Uzbek Wikipedia was blocked in Uzbekistan sometime in late 2011. While the reasons for the blockage were undisclosed, some hypothesized that the encyclopedia had been blocked because the Uzbek government was concerned about the appearance of articles critical of its actions. Others speculated that the Uzbek Wikipedia had been blocked simply as an "act of showmanship" because the government of Uzbekistan saw Uzbek-language content as subject to its jurisdiction. The blockage was not very robust: the pages of the Uzbek Wikipedia could be accessed on an HTTPS connection. Therefore, in 2013 Google started indexing pages of the Uzbek Wikipedia with HTTPS by default. Currently users in Uzbekistan can access the pages of Uzbek Wikipedia without any problems.

History 
The Uzbek Wikipedia was launched in December 2003. The very first edit was made on the main page of the encyclopedia on 21 December 2003. During 2004, Uzbek Wikipedia remained largely inactive. However, in 2005, the encyclopedia gradually started to grow.

Sometime around the end of September and beginning of October 2011, the Uzbek Wikipedia was blocked in Uzbekistan. Despite the blockage, the encyclopedia started to grow fast in 2012. During that same year, a bot was used to create a large number of articles. In 2013, another bot was used to add all of the articles of the National Encyclopedia of Uzbekistan to the Uzbek Wikipedia.

It was created to reduce international traffic for Internet users in Uzbekistan. However, the mirror has been down since June 2012.

Wikiconferences 
In 2007, the first Wikiconference of Uzbek Wikipedia editors was organized at the Tashkent University of Information Technologies. Participants included those who had not edited Wikipedia before.

WikiSummer 
In 2008, a Wikisummer ("yoz" means both "summer" and "to write" in Uzbek) contest was organized with financial support from Uzinfocom, an agency of the State Committee of Communication, Informatization, and Telecommunication Technology of Uzbekistan. The main goal of the contest was to contribute to the expansion and development of the Uzbek Wikipedia. However, few people showed interest in the Wikisummer and the contest was not successful.

OzodWiki 

In February 2014, RFE/RL's Uzbek Service, known locally as Ozodlik radiosi, launched the OzodWiki project to contribute to the development of the Uzbek Wikipedia. A wide range of articles, including interviews with active editors, reviews of existing articles, and lessons on editing Wikipedia were published as part of the project. In addition, selected words and phrases that were used in Ozodlik radiosi's reports were hyperlinked to corresponding entries in the Uzbek Wikipedia to popularize the encyclopedia. The OzodWiki project was "mutually beneficial, enabling Ozodlik users to click through to expanded information resources, while popularizing Wikipedia by driving new topics and audience their way." A total of 33 unique articles were published as part of the project. The final OzodWiki article was published in January 2016.

In a short period of time the OzodWiki project stated to have a positive impact on the Uzbek Wikipedia. While it is unlikely that all of the changes that took place after the launch of OzodWiki were a direct result of the project, a majority of these changes occurred while the project was running. While the main page of the Uzbek Wikipedia was viewed 20,368 times in January 2014, it was viewed 56,274 times in March of the same year. In March 2013, the main page had been visited 20,403 times. In April 2014, the main page was viewed a record 136,592 times. In April 2013, the main page had been visited only 12,134 times.

WikiStipendiya 

In May 2022, the Agency for Youth Affairs of the Republic of Uzbekistan launched the WikiStipendiya edit-a-thon in collaboration with the Agency of Information and Mass Communications under the Administration of the President of the Republic of Uzbekistan, the Council of Young Artists, and the Wikimedians of the Uzbek language User Group. The editathon was inspired from a decree of Shavkat Mirziyoyev on improving the presence of Uzbek language in the digital world.

The name of the project is a portmanteau of the words "wiki" and "stipendiya" (scholarship). It focuses on encouraging content creation on the Uzbek Wikipedia, particularly by students, but is not limited to any group. Another goal is to increase the number of editors on Uzbek-language wikis.

According to Nodir Atayev, a long-term Uzbek Wikipedian from Kyrgyzstan, already before 2022, government agencies began to inspect Uzbek Wikipedia and make various sample articles, thus understanding that Uzbek Wikipedia is a part of the digital world. After the inspections, people from the Youth Affairs Agency contacted Uzbek admins and Wikipedians for the possibility of a collaboration, that materialised in the WikiStipendiya contest in 2022. It is also notable that even the Uzbek president Shavkat Mirziyoyev congratulated the Uzbek community for the contest, in a speech in June 30, 2022.

Since the beginning of the contest, the number of new articles has soared in the range of 200 to 400 articles per day, and many vital articles have been made. On 3 July 2022, Uzbek Wikipedia reached 150,000 articles. On 2 August 2022, Uzbek reached 159,000 articles, after a drive for the creation of articles about archaeological sites in Uzbekistan gave nearly 3,000 articles that day. In the first week of August Uzbek Wikipedia conducted the WikiOromgoh (WikiCamp) program, hosted by the Agency for Youth Affairs and the local Wikimedians catering to young Wikipedians. The project added more than 8 thousand articles in one week and it is a part of WikiStipendiya, while those 8 thousand articles include are spread in many thematic units.

In 26 November 2022 Uzbek Wikipedia reached 200,000 articles, after several thousands of articles, many of them about settlements in Turkey, Azerbaijan and Tajikistan, as well as about many other topics, during the second WikiCamp, which takes place from 23 to 29 November 2022.

Policies

Script 

While articles in the Uzbek Wikipedia are written using the Latin script, historically the Uzbek language has used many different alphabets. Before 1928, Uzbek was written in an Arabic-based alphabet by the literate population. Between 1928 and 1940, it was written in a Latin alphabet which was different from the Latin alphabet that is used today. Starting from 1940, Uzbek began to be written in the Cyrillic alphabet, which remained the predominant form of writing until 1993.

A new Latin alphabet was introduced to Uzbek after Uzbekistan gained independence from the Soviet Union. Currently, the Latin script is used in school and university textbooks, some newspapers, and in some official papers. Since 2004 some official websites have switched over to using the Latin script when writing in Uzbek. However, the use of Cyrillic is still widespread, especially among older Uzbeks and among Uzbeks who live in other countries.

Currently, the Uzbek Wikipedia has a function ("vikifikator", literally "wikifier") which allows editors to easily convert Cyrillic text into Latin while editing. In August 2012, a Latin-to-Cyrillic converter was added to allow users to view Uzbek Wikipedia's pages in both the Latin and Cyrillic scripts.

Other policies 
Whereas in the English Wikipedia autoconfirmed status is required to move pages, edit semi-protected pages, and upload files, in the Uzbek edition these actions are not restricted. At the moment there are  administrators in the Uzbek Wikipedia.

Content 
The Uzbek Wikipedia lacks articles on contemporary political life in Uzbekistan. However, in 2012 the Uzbek Wikipedia started to grow fast despite being blocked in Uzbekistan and since that time the number of well-written articles on important subjects has increased significantly. In 2013, the coverage of the Uzbek Wikipedia expanded noticeably after all of the articles of the National Encyclopedia of Uzbekistan were added to it using a bot. Currently, the majority of articles on the Uzbek Wikipedia are about populated places, astronomical objects, people, music, and football.

Like in many other Wikipedias, Uzbek Wikipedia editors jointly determine featured and good articles. Currently, there are eleven featured and 22 good articles on the Uzbek Wikipedia. The most comprehensive articles are entries about stars, philosophy, the Republic of Korea, Tehran, Aleppo, Karabulak, Texas, Encyclopædia Britannica, Ali-Shir Nava'i, Cristiano Ronaldo, and the British Empire.

In Uzbekistan, despite that Cyrillic alphabet was replaced with a Latin one in 1992, Cyrillic continues to be used very widely in the country. Due to this, Cyrillic enjoys some use in Uzbek Wikipedia; there are pages written in Cyrillic alphabet instead of Latin, or exercise a mixed use of both. For example, the page about the Chinese leader Mao Zedong is written mostly in Cyrillic, except for a few captions.

Statistics 
The number of articles in the Uzbek Wikipedia reached 10,000 on 5 June 2012. The 10,000th article was on compass. A month later, on 5 July 2012, the article count of the encyclopedia reached 20,000. The 20,000th article was on the topic of meteorology. The Uzbek Wikipedia reached 50,000 articles on 8 November 2012. The 50,000th article was on quadratic equations. The encyclopedia reached 100,000 articles on 20 March 2013. The 100,000th article was on labor force. These increases in the number of articles were mostly achieved with the help of bots.

There are  users,  of whom have made at least one edit in the last 30 days. At the moment only  users have administrator rights. Based on the List of articles every Wikipedia should have, the Uzbek Wikipedia ranks 64th. Since 2018 the number of active users has more than doubled, from 785 in 2018 to nearly 2,000 in 2021, and the number of pageviews has increased to even 9 million pageviews in 2022 and in November 2022 the number of pageviews of the Uzbek Wikipedia in Uzbekistan surpassed those of Russian for the first time, with Uzbek garnering 11.4 million pageviews in Uzbekistan during this month.

There also approximately 60 thousand pageviews per month in Uzbek Wikipedia from Kyrgyzstan and Kazakhstan each, due to the great amount of Uzbeks living there. Some thousands of pageviews are also recorded in Turkmenistan and Tajikistan, where there are noteworthy Uzbek minorities.

Censorship 
The entire Wikipedia has been briefly blocked twice in Uzbekistan, in 2007 and 2008. The Uzbek Wikipedia was blocked in Uzbekistan around the end of September and beginning of October 2011, but caught the attention of the international press only in late February 2012 following RFE/RL's report about the blockage on 16 February 2012. Initially Internet users in Uzbekistan trying to access Uzbek-language pages got redirected to msn.com of Microsoft. Later the pages of the encyclopedia simply failed to load. Users in Uzbekistan could easily open Wikipedia articles in other languages, only Uzbek-language articles were blocked.

The reason for the blockage of the Uzbek Wikipedia has not been disclosed. Some expressed the view that the encyclopedia had been blocked because the Uzbek government was concerned about the appearance of articles critical of its actions. Sarah Kendzior, an American anthropologist, speculated that the Uzbek Wikipedia had been blocked simply as an "act of showmanship" because the government of Uzbekistan sees Uzbek-language content as subject to its jurisdiction.

The blockage was not very robust: the articles in the Uzbek-language Wikipedia could be accessed on an HTTPS connection. Therefore, in 2013 Google started indexing pages of the Uzbek Wikipedia with HTTPS by default, and visitors of the Uzbek Wikipedia started to be automatically redirected to HTTPS. Between 2013 and 2019, users in Uzbekistan could generally access pages of the Uzbek Wikipedia without major problems. In May 2019, the government of Uzbekistan unblocked several news and rights websites, including Voice of America, BBC's Uzbek Service, Amnesty International, and Human Rights Watch. Users in Uzbekistan have not faced any issues while accessing the Uzbek Wikipedia since then.

References

External links

 Uzbek Wikipedia 
 Uzbek Wikipedia mobile version 

Wikipedias by language
Uzbek-language mass media
Internet properties established in 2003
Uzbek-language encyclopedias